Brian Daniel Pintado Álvarez (born 29 July 1995 in Cuenca) is a race walker from Ecuador. He competed in the Men's 20 km walk at the 2016 Summer Olympics, finishing in 37th place with a time of 1:23:44.

He represented Ecuador at the 2020 Summer Olympics.

References

External links
 

Living people
Ecuadorian male racewalkers
Olympic athletes of Ecuador
Athletes (track and field) at the 2016 Summer Olympics
Athletes (track and field) at the 2020 Summer Olympics
Pan American Games gold medalists in athletics (track and field)
Pan American Games gold medalists for Ecuador
Athletes (track and field) at the 2019 Pan American Games
Medalists at the 2019 Pan American Games
South American Games gold medalists in athletics
1995 births
21st-century Ecuadorian people